The World Mahjong Sports Games (WMSG / Chinese:世界麻将运动会) is played to determine the World Champion in the table game Mahjong held by Mahjong International League (MIL). Both men and women are eligible to contest this title, and the championship holds both of Individual event and Team event.

History
The event was held at Sheraton Sanya Yalong Bay Hotel in China.

There were 3 styles of events including a team competition, an individual competition and a Mahjong carnival. In a Mahjong carnival, there were several styles of competitions of Riichi and MCR rules.

Champions

Individual
The names are ordered as Given name and Surname.

Team

Venues

See also
Mahjong
Mahjong International League
World Mahjong Organization
World Mahjong Championship

References

External links
Mahjong International League

Mahjong world championships